Augusto Orrel: memorie d'orrore e poesia is a semi-autobiographical novel written in Italian language by Menotti Lerro and printed on 2007 by Joker Publishing.

Critical reception

According to Andrew Mangham "in this text, the author describes young Orrel's experiences of becoming a man. The latter (whose name is "Lerro" spelt backwards) is a character that the author admits to having based on himself. In this book we find a modern manifestation of Goethe's Werther: a melancholy and passionate young man whose sorrows are outlined in a language that is both striking and raw. Lerro describes how Augusto is forced to play the role of father to his own father  due to the latter's increasing level of psychological delusion." Maria Rita Parsi claimed that "Augusto Orrel is a very poetical novel, refreshing the reader." Francesco D'Episcopo from Federico II University stressed that "this is the story of a  family devastated by the sudden illness of the father and the difficulties of a child who later became a hero".

References

Bibliography
Francesco D'Episcopo, Menotti Lerro, Tra Drammaturgia e Narrativa, Genesi, 2019 
Andrew Mangham, The Poetry of Menotti Lerro, Cambridge Scholars Publishing, 2012 
Maria Rita Parsi on Il Resto del Carlino, 2010

External Links
Official page
UNISA LIBRARY CATALOGUE
OPAC
COPAC 
Augusto Orrel on openlibrary

2007 Italian novels